Four Moons of Darkover is an anthology of fantasy and science fiction short stories edited by Marion Zimmer Bradley. The stories are set in Bradley's world of Darkover. The book was first published by DAW Books (No. 761) in November 1988.

Contents
 Introduction by Marion Zimmer Bradley
 "The Jackal" by Vera Nazarian
 "Death's Scepter" by Joan Marie Verba
 "A King's Ransom" by Kay Morgan Douglas
 "Man of Impulse" by Marion Zimmer Bradley
 "Swarm Song" by Roxana Pierson
 "Out of Ashes" by Patricia B. Cirone
 "My Father’s Son" by Meg Mac Donald
 "House Rules" by Marion Zimmer Bradley
 "To Challenge Fate" by Sandra C. Morrese
 "The Devourer Within" by Margaret L. Carter
 "Sin Catenas" by Elisabeth Waters
 "Circles" by G. R. Sixbury
 "Festival Night" by Dorothy J. Heydt
 "A Laughing Matter" by Rachel Walker
 "Mourning" by Audrey J. Fulton
 "The Death of Brendon Ensolare" by Deborah Wheeler
 "Sort of Chaos" by Millea Kenin

Sources
 
 
 
 

Darkover books
1988 anthologies
American anthologies
Fantasy anthologies
Works by Marion Zimmer Bradley
DAW Books books